is the third studio album by Japanese singer Shiori Niiyama. It was released on 30 November 2016, one year and five months after second studio album Hello Goodbye. The album was recorded under Being Inc. label.

Background
Album includes previous 2 released singles- Tonari no Yukue and Atashi wa Atashi no Mama de. A famous Japanese musicians as Fukuyama Masaharu were involved with the music production of the album. The album was released in three version: regular one with special CD of cover song which were previously released as b-side of singles,  first press release first version which includes special DVD disc with music clips and second version with live performances.

Charting
The album reached #14 in daily rank and #26 for first week. It's charting for two weeks.

Track listing
All songs were written by Shiori Niiyama (expect tracks #3 (by Fukuyama Masaharu) and #4 (by Miyuki Nakajima)).

In media
Koi no Naka was used as insert song for drama Love song
Snow Smile was used as commercial song for event Fuyu Spo!! Winter Sports Festa16
Atashi wa Atashi no Mama de was used as official image song for Nihon TV programMusical Instrument Fair 2016 
Kei was used as ending song for movie Koto 
Namae no nai Tegami was used as insert song for short YouTube movie Matcha!! 
Mou, Ikanakucha. was used as theme song for movie Hotel Coban

References

2016 albums
Shiori Niiyama albums
Being Inc. albums
Japanese-language albums